The Willsaphone Stupid Show is a two CD collection of recordings edited from two different broadcasts on KPFA's Over the Edge radio show, hosted by Don Joyce.  

The Weatherman (a.k.a. David Wills) has been involved with Negativland since the beginning, but before that he was an audiophile of an unusual nature, and began recording himself and his family at a very young age.  Presented on these discs is a rather extensive audio collage using the home-recordings David Wills made of himself and his family, dating back to when he was a child.  For the uninitiated, these are extremely voyeuristic samples of a suburban family from the 1960s, 1970s and 1980s.  The Weatherman is a fan-favorite among Negativland fans, and by proxy, his family has become well known via Over The Edge.  This CD set is a chance to experience the Wills family firsthand.  

This album was released in 1993 by Negativland's own label, Seeland Records, as a CD.

Track listing

THE WILLSAPHONE STUPID SHOW
Moments to Remember, Raining Hard, etc. (13:30)
I'm the Vegetable, Wired Up House, Steamin' Mad at Dirt, etc. (10:30)
HOME CABLE T.V. REPAIR CORNER (8:26)
Fruitcakes, Suka-Brand Coffee, Power Failure, Citizen's Band Parakeet, etc. (10:34)
Moldy Bagels (2:05)
Cats, In Between Frequencies, etc. (3:50)
(More) Weatherman vs. The Monkees, HOME CLEANING FOCUS CORNER, etc. (12:14)
A Rash of Rabid Skunks (2:19)
Dreams About Fire, Mr. Dirt, White Clouds in the Sky and The End (9:43)

THE WILLSAPHONE STUPID SHOW II
Oven Noises (3:40)
Introduction, First Club Soda, Toads, etc. (10:51)
Fuck You, Tough Darts, Jingle Bells, etc. (5:32)
Weather Reports, WEATHER HOT LINE (7:54)
Toilet Noises, Lumpy Gravy, etc. (4:12)
Comb Music (9:23)
Acting Silly, Chewing Up ShaNaNa, etc. (5:05)
Ho-Ho-Ho, No More Recordings, Easy-Off, etc. (6:54)
FAKE BACON AND ELECTRONIC MUSIC HOT LINE (7:58)
(Still More) Weatherman vs. The Monkees, Casual Talk (5:54)
Barnacle Bill and Final Comments (6:43)

Personnel
David Wills
Don Joyce
Richard Lyons
Buzzy Linhart
Chris Grigg
Mark Hosler

Negativland albums
1993 compilation albums